Actias truncatipennis is an uncommon moth of the family Saturniidae that is found in Mexico. The species was first described by Léon Sonthonnax in 1899.

It resembles the Luna moth but is considerably larger.

References

Moths described in 1899
Truncatipennis
Moths of Central America